Anvik Airport  is a public airport located one mile (2 km) southeast of the central business district of Anvik, a city in the Yukon-Koyukuk Census Area, Alaska of the U.S. state of Alaska. It is owned by the state.

Facilities
Anvik Airport has one runway (17/35) with a gravel surface measuring 2,960 x 75 ft. (902 x 23 m).

Airlines and destinations

Prior to its bankruptcy and cessation of all operations, Ravn Alaska served the airport from multiple locations.

Statistics

References

External links
 FAA Alaska airport diagram (GIF)

Airports in the Yukon–Koyukuk Census Area, Alaska